Zhejiang Conservatory of Music is a metro station on Fuyang section of Line 6 of the Hangzhou Metro in China. It was opened on 30 December 2020, together with Line 6. It is located in the Xihu District of Hangzhou.

Gallery

References 

Railway stations in Zhejiang
Railway stations in China opened in 2020
Hangzhou Metro stations